Stavrianos Vistiaris (16th-17th century), was a Greek poet born in the village of Maliçan, in modern Sarande District, a region of Albania.

He became renowned because of his extensive epic poem: Braveries of the noble and valiant voevode Michael. The poem was written around 1602 in a medieval Greek dialect; at the time Vistiaris was working at the court of the ruler of Wallachia, Michael the Brave.

The work describes the personality and life of the Wallachian ruler.

References

16th-century births
17th-century deaths
People from Finiq
Male poets from the Ottoman Empire
Modern Greek-language writers
17th-century writers from the Ottoman Empire
17th-century poets from the Ottoman Empire
17th-century male writers